This is a list of assets owned by Japanese multinational conglomerate Sony Group Corporation.

Subsidiaries and affiliates by business segment

Electronics
 Sony Corporation
 Sony Global Manufacturing & Operations Corporation

Sony Semiconductor Solutions Group
 Sony Semiconductor Solutions
 Sony Semiconductor Manufacturing
Japan Advanced Semiconductor Manufacturing (joint venture with TSMC and Denso)
Sony Semiconductor Israel (formerly Altair Semiconductor)
 Sony Depthsensing Solutions (formerly SoftKinetic)
 Sony Advanced Visual Sensing

Sony Pictures Entertainment Inc. 

 Sony Pictures Studios
 Sony Pictures Studios Post Production Facilities
 Worldwide Product Fulfillment
 Madison Gate Records
 Sony Pictures Consumer Products
 Sony Pictures Entertainment Japan Inc.
 AK Holdings
 Animax Broadcast Japan Inc. (joint venture with Bandai Namco, Toei Animation, TMS Entertainment and Nihon Ad Systems)
 Kids Station
 Mystery Channel
 MADHOUSE Inc.
 Sony Pictures Europe
 Sony Pictures Interactive
 Sony Pictures Digital Productions Inc.
 Sony Pictures Motion Picture Group
 Columbia Pictures
 Ghost Corps
 3000 Pictures
 Screen Gems
 Sony Pictures Animation
 Sony Pictures Classics
 Sony Pictures Releasing
 Sony Pictures Releasing International
 Sony Pictures Releasing de México
 Sony Pictures Imageworks
 Sony Pictures Home Entertainment
 Sony Wonder
 Genius Brands (Minority stake)
 Genius Brands Music
 Kartoon Channel
 Baby Genius
 Stan Lee Universe
 A Squared Entertainment LLC
 Stan Lee Comics LLC (60%)
 Wow Unlimited Media
 Mainframe Studios
 Frederator Networks
 Frederator Studios
 Frederator Films
 Channel Frederator Network
 StashRiot
 Cartoon Hangover
 Frederator Flux
 The Leaderboard Network
 Cinematica
 MicDrop
 Atomo Network (Joint venture with Ánima)
 Frederator Books
 Thirty Labs
 Ezrin Hirsh Entertainment (EHE)
 Big Picture Productions
 Universal Sony Pictures Home Entertainment (joint venture with Universal Pictures Home Entertainment)
 Sony Pictures Worldwide Acquisitions Group
 Destination Films
 Stage 6 Films
 Affirm Films
 Affirm Television
 Pure Flix
 TriStar Pictures
 TriStar Productions
 Crunchyroll, LLC (shared ownership with Aniplex)
 Crunchyroll UK and Ireland
 Madman Anime
 Crunchyroll EMEA
 Crunchyroll SAS
 Crunchyroll SA
 Crunchyroll GmbH
 Crunchyroll Studios
 Crunchyroll Games, LLC
 Right Stuf
 Nozomi Entertainment
 5 Points Pictures
 RightStufAnime.com
 Sony Pictures Television
 Sony Pictures Television Studios
 Adelaide Productions
 CPT Holdings, Inc.
 Gemstone Studios
 TriStar Television
 2waytraffic
 2waytraffic Mobile
 2waytraffic International
 Bad Wolf
 Blueprint Television (joint venture with Blueprint Pictures)
 Califon Productions, Inc.
 Culver Entertainment
 Eleventh Hour Films
 Eleven
 Embassy Row
 Fable Pictures
 Floresta
 Huaso
 Human Media
 Jeopardy Productions, Inc.
 Lean-M
 Left Bank Pictures
 Palladium Fiction
 Curio Pictures
 Satisfy (joint venture with Satisfaction Group; 20%)
 Silvergate Media
 Stellify Media
 Stolen Picture
 Teleset
 Teleset Mexico
 Toro Media
 The Whisper Group
 Sony Pictures Television Networks
 Culver Max Entertainment Private Limited
 Sony Entertainment Television
 Sony Ten
 Sony Max
 Sony Max 2
 Sony SAB
 SonyLIV
 Sony Six
 Sony Aath
 Sony BBC Earth (joint venture with BBC Studios)
 Sony YAY!
 Sony Pix
 Sony Wah
 Sony Pal
 Sony Marathi
 Studio NEXT
 Sony Pictures Networks Productions
 AXN
 AXN Black
 AXN Movies
 AXN Mystery
 AXN Now
 AXN Spin
 AXN White
 Sony Cine
 Sony AXN
 getTV
 Lifetime Latin America (joint venture with A+E Networks Latin America, distributed by Ole Distribution)
 Sony Channel
 Sony Movies (United States)
 Sony Pictures Cable Ventures I Inc.
 Game Show Network, LLC
Pixomondo

Sony Music Group 

 Sony Music Publishing
 4 Star Records
 APM Music
 Sonoton
 Bruton Music
 Cezame Music
 Hard and Kosinus
 Bleeding Fingers Music
 Challenge Records
 EMI Music Publishing
 EMI Production Music
 Extreme Music
 Hickory Records
 KPM Music
 Remote Control Productions
 Sony Music Entertainment Inc.
 Columbia Records
 Startime International
 Epic Records
 Bad Boy Records
 Freebandz
 Ariola
 Deutsche Harmonia Mundi
 So So Def Recordings
 Volcano Entertainment
 Kemosabe Records
 Legacy Recordings
 The Orchard
 Blind Pig Records
 Frenchkiss Records
 RED Music
 Shrapnel Records
 RCA Records
 RCA Inspiration
 Fo Yo Soul
 GospoCentric Records
 B'Rite Music
 Quiet Water Entertainment
 Verity Records
 Ultra Records
 Sony Masterworks
 Masterworks Broadway
 Milan Records
 Okeh Records
 Portrait Records
 Sony Classical Records
 Sony Music Australia
 Sony Music Brazil
 Amigo Records
 Phonomotor Records
 Som Livre
 Sony Music Canada
 Ratas Music Group
 Sony Music China
 Sony Music France
 Sony Music Entertainment Hong Kong
 Sony Music Entertainment Poland
 Sony Music India
 Zee Music Company
 Sony Music Indonesia
 Sony Music Latin
 Sony Music Mexico
 Sony Music Nashville
 Arista Nashville
 Columbia Nashville
 RCA Records Nashville
 Provident Label Group
 Essential Records
 Flicker Records
 Provident Films
 Reunion Records
 Beach Street Records
 Sony Music Philippines
 Sony Music Taiwan
 Sony Music Thailand
 Bakery Music
 Sony BEC-TERO Music
 Sony Music UK
 Black Butter Records (49%)
 Columbia Records UK
 Dream Life Records
 Insanity Records (joint venture with Insanity Group)
 Magic Star
 Ministry of Sound
 Music For Nations
 RCA Label Group UK
 Relentless Records
 Since '93
 Sony Commercial Group
 Sony Music Legacy - UK
 Sony Music Nashville UK
 Sony Music Entertainment Japan
 Aniplex
 A-1 Pictures Inc.
 Aniplex of America Inc.
 Aniplex (Shanghai) Ltd. (51%)
 Boundary Inc.
 CloverWorks Inc.
 Crunchyroll, LLC (shared ownership with Sony Pictures)
 Crunchyroll UK and Ireland
 Madman Anime
 Crunchyroll EMEA
 Crunchyroll SAS
 Crunchyroll SA
 Crunchyroll GmbH
 Crunchyroll Studios
 Crunchyroll Games, LLC
 Right Stuf
 Nozomi Entertainment
 5 Points Pictures
 RightStufAnime.com
 Peppermint Anime GmbH (joint venture with Peppermint GmbH)
 Quatro A Inc.
 Rialto Entertainment Inc.
 Ariola Japan
 Epic Records Japan
 Kioon Music
 Fitz Beat
 Haunted Records
 Ki/oon Records2
 NeOSITE
 Siren Song
 Trefort
 M-On Entertainment, Inc.
 Music On! TV
 mora
 Peanuts Worldwide (39%; with WildBrain (41%) and Charles M. Schulz Creative Associates (20%))
 Sacra Music
 Sony Creative Products Inc.
 Sony DADC Japan Inc.
 Sony Music Artists Inc.
 Sony Music Communications Inc.
 Sony Music Direct (Japan) Inc.
 Sony Music Labels Inc.
 Sony Music Marketing Inc.
 Sony Music Associated Records
 Sony Music Publishing
 Sony Music Records
 gr8! Records
 Mastersix Foundation
 N46Div
 Niagara Records
 VVV Records
 Unties

Sony Interactive Entertainment

 Audiokinetic
 Bungie
 Evolution Championship Series (joint venture with rts.gg)
 Gaikai
 PlayStation
 PlayStation Productions
 PlayStation Studios
 Bluepoint Games
 Firesprite
 Fabrik Games
 Guerrilla Games
 Haven Studios
 Housemarque
 Insomniac Games
 Insomniac North Carolina
 Media Molecule
 Naughty Dog
 ICE Team
 Nixxes Software
 Polyphony Digital
 Bend Studio
 Team Asobi
 London Studio
 Malaysia Studio
 San Diego Studio
 San Mateo Studio
 Santa Monica Studio
 Savage Game Studios
 Sucker Punch Productions
 Valkyrie Entertainment
 Visual Arts
 XDev
 Repeat.gg
 SN Systems

Sony Financial Holdings Inc.
 Sony Life Insurance Co., Ltd.
 Sony Assurance Inc.
 Sony Bank Inc.
 Sony Lifecare Inc.

Sony Honda Mobility Inc.
 Afeela

Foundations and schools
 Sony Foundation for Education
 Sony Music Foundation
 Sony USA Foundation Inc.
 Sony Foundation Australia Trustee Ltd.
 Sony of Canada Science Scholarship Foundation Inc.
 Sony Europe Foundation
 Shohoku College

Subsidiaries and affiliates by location

Japan
Sony Music Entertainment (Japan) Inc.
 Sony Music Labels Inc.
 Sony Music Marketing Inc.
 Sony Music Communications Inc.
 Sony Music Artists Inc.
 Sony Creative Products Inc.
 Sony DADC Japan Inc.
 Sony Pictures Entertainment (Japan) Inc.
 AK Holdings Corporation
 Animax Broadcast Japan Inc.
 Kids Station Inc.
 AXN Japan Inc.
 Mystery Channel, Inc.
 Sony Energy Devices Corporation
 Sony Network Communications Inc.
 Sony Biz Networks Corporation
 SMN Corporation (formerly So-net Media Networks Co., Ltd.) (58.7%)
 MotionPortrait, Inc.
 Sony Computer Science Laboratories, Inc.
 Sony PCL Inc.
 Sony Marketing Inc.
 Sony Global Solutions Inc.
 Sony Global Education, Inc.
 P5, Inc.
 FeliCa Networks, Inc. (51%; joint venture with NTT Docomo and JR East)
 AII Inc. (60.9%)
 Frontage Inc. (60%)
 SRE Holdings (formerly Sony Real Estate Corporation) (36.9%)
 Aerosense Inc. (joint venture with ZMP Inc. and Sumitomo Corporation)
 M3, Inc. (34%)
 Sony Olympus Medical Solutions Inc. (51%; joint venture with Olympus)
 Sony Enterprise Co.,Ltd.
 Ginza Sony Park
 Sony People Solutions Inc.
 Sony Honda Mobility (50%; joint venture with Honda)

Canada
 Sony Canada

United States
 Sony Corporation of America
 Sony Entertainment Inc.
 Sony Music Group
 Sony Pictures Entertainment Inc.
 Sony Creative Software
 Sony Digital Audio Disc Corporation
Sony Magnetic Products Inc. of America
 Sony Latin America

Latin America
 Sony Argentina S.A.
 Sony Comércio e Indústria Ltda. (Brazil)
 Sony Componentes Ltda. (Brazil)
 Sony da Amazônia Ltda. (Brazil)
 Sony Chile Ltda. (Chile)
 Sony de México S.A. de C.V.
 Sony de Mexicali, S.A. de C.V. (Mexico)
 Sony Nuevo Laredo, S.A. de C.V. (Mexico)
 Sony de Tijuana Oeste, S.A. de C.V. (Mexico)
 Sony Corporation of Panama, S. A.
 Sony Puerto Rico, Inc.
 Sony Pictures Home Entertainment de México S.A. de C.V.

Europe
 Sony Austria GmbH.
 Sony DACD Austria A.G.
 Sony DADC Europe Limited
 Sony DADC, OOO (Borovsk, Russia)
 Sony Service Centre (Europe) N.V. (Brussels, Belgium)
 Sony Overseas S.A. (Switzerland)
 Sony Czech, spol. s.r.o.
 Sony Berlin G.m.b.H. (Germany)
 Sony Deutschland G.m.b.H. (Köln, Germany)
 Sony Europe GmbH (Germany)
 Sony Nordic A/S (Denmark)
 Sony España S.A. (Spain)
 Sony France S.A.
 Sony United Kingdom Ltd.
 Sony Global Treasury Service Plc (UK)
 Sony Computer Entertainment Europe Limited (UK)
 Sony Hungaria Kft. (Hungary)
 Sony Italia S.p.A. (Italy)
 Sony Benelux B.V. (Netherlands)
 Sony Europa B.V. (Netherlands)
 Sony Logistics Europe B.V. (Netherlands)
 Sony Poland Sp.z.o.o. (Poland)
 Sony Portugal Ltda. (Portugal)
 Sony Slovakia s r. o. (Slovakia)
 Sony Eurasia Pazarlama A.S. (Turkey)

China
 Sony (China) Ltd.
 Beijing Suohong Electronics Co., Ltd.
 Shanghai Suoguang Visual Products Co., Ltd.
 Shanghai Suoguang Electronics Co., Ltd.
 Sony Electronics (Wuxi) Co., Ltd.
 Sony Corporation of Hong Kong Ltd.
 Sony International (Hong Kong) Ltd.

South Korea
 Sony Electronics of Korea Corporation
 Sony Korea Corporation

India
 Sony India Private Limited
 Sony India Software Services Pvt. Ltd
 Culver Max Entertainment

Southeast Asia and Oceania
 PT Sony Indonesia
 Sony Electronics (Malaysia) SDN. BHD.
 Sony Technology (Malaysia) SDN. BHD.
 Sony Philippines, Inc.
 Sony Electronics (Singapore) Pte. LTD.
 Sony Magnetic Products (Thailand) Co., Ltd.
 Sony Mobile Electronics (Thailand) Co., Ltd.
 Sony Device Technology (Thailand) Co., Ltd.
 Sony Siam Industries Co., Ltd.
 Sony Australia Limited
 Sony Computer Entertainment Australia Pty. Ltd
 Sony New Zealand Ltd.
 Sony Vietnam Ltd.

Middle East
 Sony Middle East and Africa FZE (UAE)

Non-affiliate holdings

Japan
 Japan Display (1.2%)
 JOLED (approx. 5%)
 Kadokawa Corporation (1.93%)
 Madhouse (5%)
 MBS Media Holdings, Inc. (4.44%)
 Toei Animation (1.86%)
 VAIO Corporation (5%)

United States
 Epic Games (1.4%)
 Mangamo

Mainland China
Bilibili Inc. (4.98%)

Europe 

 Spotify Technology S.A. (2.35%)

Former holdings and subsidiaries

Sold or spun off
 Avex Group
 Chart Show TV - Sold to TRACE Group (currently Trace Hits)
 Chart Show Hits - Sold to TRACE Group (itself closed on 1 June 2020)
 Crackle - Sold to Chicken Soup for the Soul Entertainment
 FEARnet HD (jointly owned by Comcast and Lionsgate) - Sold to Comcast and folded into Syfy and Chiller
 Film1 - closed, then relaunched by SPI International in 2019
 Gracenote - Sold to Tribune Media (later sold to Nielsen)
 Loews Cineplex Entertainment - Sold to Onex Corporation in 2002; Theatres now owned by Cineplex Entertainment in Canada and AMC Theatres in the United States
 Movielink (jointly owned by Paramount Pictures, Universal Pictures, Metro-Goldwyn-Mayer, and Warner Bros.) - Sold to Blockbuster LLC
 The Orchard Film Group - divested and renamed 1091 Media
 Sony Chemicals Corporation - Sold off and became Dexerials.
 Sony Online Entertainment - Sold to Columbus Nova and became Daybreak Game Company
 Sony Pictures Television's Southeast Asian channels - Sold to KC Global Media
 Animax
 AXN
 Gem
 One
 Sony Pictures Television's UK channels - Sold to Narrative Capital
 Sony Channel - became Great! TV
 Sony Movies - became Great! Movies
 Sony Movies Action - became Great! Movies Action
 Sony Movies Classic - became Great! Movies Classic
 Pop
 Pop Max
 Tiny Pop
 Viasat 3 - Sold to ANT1 Group
 Viasat 6 - Sold to ANT1 Group
 Sunbow Entertainment - Sold to TV-Loonland AG in November 2000.
 Starz TV - Sold to TRACE Group (itself closed on 1 June 2020)
 The Vault - Sold to TRACE Group (currently Trace Vault)
 Syco Entertainment (excl. Syco Music) - Stake held by Sony sold back to Simon Cowell

Defunct
Electronics

All of these companies below were merged into Sony Electronics Corporation in April 2021, with the surviving entity changed its name to Sony Corporation.
 Sony Imaging Products & Solutions Inc.
 Sony Home Entertainment & Sound Products Inc.
 Sony Mobile Communications Inc.

Sony Marketing Inc., a subsidiary of Sony Corporation, merged the following company in April 2021.
 Sony Business Solutions Corporation
Sony Semiconductor Solutions Corporation
 Sony LSI Design Inc. - merged into Sony Semiconductor Solutions Corporation in April 2022.

Sony Pictures Entertainment
 Hooq
 3D NetCo LLC (3net, jointly owned with Discovery Communications and IMAX)
 Animax Europe
 Animax Germany
 Anime on Demand
 Bliss
 Bolder Media
 CSC Media Group - Folded into Sony Pictures Television in 2019
 Electric Ray
 First Independent Films
 Flava*
 Movies4Men 2
 Pop Girl
 Scarlet Media - Closed down after Simon Andrae went to FOX
 Scuzz
 Sony Channel Southeast Asia
 Sony Crime Channel
 Sony Le Plex HD
 Sony Pictures Family Entertainment Group
 Sony Pictures Mobile
 Sony Rox HD
 True Crime
 True Drama
 True Movies 2
 TV1 General Entertainment Partnership (jointly owned by SPT, CBS Studios International and NBCUniversal)
 TV1
 SF
 Silver River Productions
 Victory Television - Shut down after Victoria Ashbourne stepped down

Sony Music

550 Music
 Abril Music - bought from Editora Abril in 2003 by BMG and absorbed by Ariola Records
 Anime on Demand
Battery Records (hip hop)
Bertelsmann Music Group
Beyond Records
Bluebird Records
BMG Heritage Records
Buddah Records
BMG Kidz
 BNA Records
Burgundy Records
Chaos Recordings
 C2 Records
 Colpix Records/Colgems Records
 Francis, Day & Hunter Ltd.
 Frenchkiss Label Group
 Indolent Records
 J Records
GUN Records
Kinetic Records
LaFace Records
Logic Records
 MTM Music Group
 MTM Records
 BriarPatch Music
 CottonPatch Music
 DebDave Music, Inc.
 Mallven Music
 Multitone Records
 Novus Records
 Odd Future Records
Ode Records
 Odyssey Records
 Philles Records
 Playbill Records
Private Music
Profile Records
RCA Camden
RCA Gold Seal
RCA Italiana
RCA Victrola
Ruthless Records
S2 Records
Windham Hill Records
Living Music
Vinyl Solution
 Windswept Pacific Music - catalog acquired by EMI Music Publishing
Work Group
Zomba Group of Companies
Benson Records
Capricorn Records
Internal Affairs
Jive Records
Battery Records (dance)
Jive Electro
Mojo Records
Scotti Brothers Records
Silvertone Records
Sub•Lime Records
Zoo Entertainment

Sony Pictures Networks India
 AXN
 Sony Le Plex
 Sony ROX
 Sony Mix
 Sony ESPN

Game & Network Services
 989 Studios/989 Sports
 Bigbig Studios
 Contrail
 Evolution Studios
 Japan Studio
Project Siren
 Guerrilla Cambridge
 Incognito Entertainment
 Studio Liverpool
 Team Ico
 Team Soho
 Zipper Interactive

See also 
 List of libraries owned by Sony
 List of acquisitions by Sony

References

External links
 

Subsidiaries
Sony subsidiaries
Asset lists
Lists of corporate subsidiaries